The American Library Association accredits the following library schools and master’s programs in library and information studies.

United States

Alabama
 University of Alabama College of Communication and Information Sciences

Arizona
University of Arizona School of Information Resources and Library Science (College of Social and Behavioral Sciences)]

California
 San Jose State University: School of Information
 University of California, Los Angeles (UCLA): Department of Information Studies (UCLA Graduate School of Education & Information Studies)
 University of Southern California (USC)

Colorado
 University of Denver: Library and Information Science (Morgridge College of Education)

District of Columbia
 The Catholic University of America: School of Library and Information Science

Florida
 Florida State University: Florida's iSchool: School of Library and Information Studies
 University of South Florida: School of Information

Georgia
 Valdosta State University: Library and Information Science

Hawaii
 University of Hawaii at Mānoa: Library and Information Science Program

Illinois
 Chicago State University: Library and Information Science
 Dominican University: Library and Information Science
 University of Illinois at Urbana–Champaign: The iSchool at Illinois: Graduate School of Library and Information Science

Indiana
 Indiana University - Bloomington: Department of Information & Library Science
 Indiana University Purdue University Indianapolis: Department of Library & Information Science

Iowa
 University of Iowa: School of Library and Information Science

Kansas
 Emporia State University: School of Library and Information Management

Kentucky
 University of Kentucky: Library and Information Science

Louisiana
 Louisiana State University: School of Library and Information Science

Maryland
 University of Maryland, College Park: Maryland's iSchool: College of Information Studies

Massachusetts
 Simmons School of Library and Information Science

Michigan
 University of Michigan: School of Information
 Wayne State University: School of Library and Information Science

Minnesota
 St. Catherine University: Master of Library and Information Science

Mississippi
 University of Southern Mississippi: School of Library and Information Science

Missouri
 University of Missouri: Library and Information Science

New Jersey
 Rutgers University: School of Communication and Information School of Communication and Information (Online)

New York
 Long Island University: Palmer School of Library and Information Science
 Pratt Institute: School of Information and Library Science
 CUNY (Queens College): Graduate School of Library and Information Studies
 St. John's University: Library and Information Science
 State University of New York (Albany): College of Computing and Information (Information Studies Department)
 SUNY at Buffalo: Department of Library and Information Studies (Graduate School of Education)
 Syracuse University: School of Information Studies

North Carolina
 East Carolina University: Library Science
 North Carolina Central University: School of Library and Information Sciences
 University of North Carolina at Chapel Hill: UNC School of Information and Library Science
 University of North Carolina at Greensboro: Library and Information Studies (School of Education)

Ohio
 Kent State University: School of Library and Information Science

Oklahoma
 University of Oklahoma: School of Library and Information Studies

Pennsylvania
 Clarion University of Pennsylvania: Department of Library Science
 Drexel University: The iSchool: College of Information Science and Technology
 University of Pittsburgh School of Information Sciences: Library and Information Science

Rhode Island
 University of Rhode Island: Graduate School of Library and Information Studies

South Carolina
 University of South Carolina: School of Library and Information Science

Tennessee
 University of Tennessee: School of Information Sciences (College of Communication and Information)

Texas
 Texas Woman's University: School of Library and Information Studies
 University of North Texas: Department of Library and Information Sciences (College of Information)
 University of Texas at Austin: School of Information

Washington
 University of Washington: Information School

Wisconsin
 University of Wisconsin–Madison: School of Library and Information Studies
 University of Wisconsin–Milwaukee: School of Information Studies

Puerto Rico
 University of Puerto Rico, (Recinto de Río Piedras): Escuela Graduada de Ciencias y Tecnologías de la Información (taught in Spanish)

Canada

Alberta
 University of Alberta: School of Library and Information Studies (Faculty of Education)

British Columbia
 University of British Columbia: iSchool @ UBC (School of Library, Archival, and Information Studies)

Nova Scotia
 Dalhousie University: School of Information Management

Ontario
 University of Toronto: Faculty of Information (iSchool)
 University of Western Ontario: Master of Library and Information Science (Faculty of Information and Media Studies)
 University of Ottawa: School of Information Studies Master of Information Studies

Quebec
 McGill University: School of Information Studies (mostly taught in English)
 Université de Montréal: École de bibliothéconomie et des sciences de l'information (taught in French)

Conditionally accredited library schools
 Long Island University

References

External links
 ALA Accredited Programs
 List of ALA-Accredited Library Schools

American Library Association
Library